Buffalo (or Buffalo Club) is a drinking game where participants agree to only drink from their glass with their non-dominant hand. If they are caught using the other hand, they must 'chug' or 'skull' (rapidly finish) their drink.

People who play the game refer to themselves as "Buffalos", and groups of players may refer to themselves as a "Buffalo club".

History
The history and origin of the Buffalo Club are obscure and many versions are in existence. A folk origin of the game states that Buffalo Club stems from the gunslinging days of the Wild West where the use of one's right hand (the shooting hand) was at times a matter of life or death.  Thus, recreational activities such as playing cards or drinking were done with the left hand only to avoid severe consequences. The game is now popular around the world.

Basic game

The rules are fairly simple, though widely varying, and involve which hand a player may use to drink.

The basic rule of the game is that a player can only drink with their non-dominant hand. If any other Buffalo players spot them drinking with their dominant hand, they call Buffalo on the player and that player must finish their drink as quickly as possible. If the player hesitates to finish their drink, the other players will usually proceed to make a ruckus chanting "Buffalo!" and banging on the table until the player finishes.

The game is often presented as a "lifetime commitment", where agreeing to play it means that others who know this may catch you out for drinking with the wrong hand at any point in the future.

Variants
 In one version of the game, all players must drink with their left hand, irrespective of their dominant hand. This removes the need for players to ask each others' dominant hand.
 In some parts of Australia the non-dominant hand must also have the pinkie either raised or at least not in contact with the drink.
 Completing a buffalo with the proper hand can be called a double buffalo, forcing the player to chug two drinks.
 If the player calls Buffalo on somebody when they are actually drinking with the proper hand, there is no penalty 
 If a player is ambidextrous and uses this as an excuse, they have to finish your drink and then a hand will be decided for them.
 Some players rule that the dominant hand must be used when drinking non-alcoholic beverages, to discourage a player from adjusting their drinking hand for all drinks.
 Reverse Buffalo Fridays whereby between the hours of 12am Friday morning until 11:59:59pm Friday night, players must drink with their dominant hands.
 The Left Hand brewery promotes its milk stout as being an "immunity beer", which may be drunk with either hand by Buffalo players.

See also
The Game (mind game), another game in which the players are perpetually playing.

References

Drinking games
American frontier